Július Strnisko (6 August 1958 – 20 September 2008) was a heavyweight freestyle wrestler from Slovakia. He competed for Czechoslovakia at the 1980 and 1988 Olympics and won a bronze medal in 1980. He won two more bronze medals at the European championships in 1982 and 1983.

References

1958 births
2008 deaths
Sportspeople from Nitra
Czechoslovak male sport wrestlers
Slovak male sport wrestlers
Olympic wrestlers of Czechoslovakia
Wrestlers at the 1980 Summer Olympics
Wrestlers at the 1988 Summer Olympics
Czech male sport wrestlers
Olympic bronze medalists for Czechoslovakia
Olympic medalists in wrestling
Medalists at the 1980 Summer Olympics